Music For Your Mother  is a compilation album by Funkadelic featuring songs recorded for Westbound Records during the band's career with that label from 1968 to 1976. The compilation includes the A-sides and B-sides of every Funkadelic single released during Funkadelic's tenure at Westbound. Some of the tracks here originated as alternate versions of album tracks or as non-album B-sides, and some were previously unreleased. Two tracks, "I Miss My Baby" and "Baby I Owe You Something Good" (original version) were originally released by Westbound under the group name U.S. Music With Funkadelic, which was probably meant to denote "U.S. with music by Funkadelic" or simply "U.S. with Funkadelic." U.S. refers to the band United Soul that had been discovered and produced by George Clinton in 1971, and which contained future Parliament-Funkadelic members Garry Shider and Cordell Mosson.

The CD booklet features an extensive 20,000-word article by music writer and Parliament-Funkadelic historian Rob Bowman. In the 2000s, many of the non-LP tracks included in this anthology were added as bonus tracks on Westbound CD reissues of their respective original albums.

Track listing

Disc One

Disc Two

References

Other sources
Liner notes to Music For Your Mother by Rob Bowman, 1992.

External links
 Music for Your Mother: Funkadelic 45s at Discogs
 The Motherpage

1993 compilation albums
Funkadelic albums